William Whitaker (4 May 1836 in London – 15 January 1925 in Croydon) was a British geologist.

Early life
He was educated at St Albans School and University College, London, where he gained a degree in chemistry in 1855.

Career
He became a geologist, specializing initially in water surveying and mapping.  His thorough research, wide knowledge, and his numerous publications, especially his The Geology of London and of Part of the Thames Valley (1889) has led some to call him “the father of English hydrogeology”.   He retired in 1896 but continued to work as a water engineer.

Honours
He was elected fellow of the Geological Society in 1859, and FRS in 1883.  He was president of numerous societies, including both the Geologists’ Association and the Geological Society, and was a recipient of the latter’s Murchison Medal in 1886 and Wollaston Medal in 1923. He died in Croydon, Surrey.

Further reading
Oxford Dictionary of National Bibliography

References

 Entry in Who's Who
 W. H. George:  entry in Oxford Dictionary of National Biography

External links
 

Alumni of University College London
19th-century British geologists
1836 births
1925 deaths
People from St Albans
Wollaston Medal winners
Fellows of the Royal Society
Fellows of the Geological Society of London
People educated at St Albans School, Hertfordshire
Artists' Rifles soldiers
Presidents of the Geologists' Association